Verene Albertha Shepherd (née Lazarus; born 1951) is a Jamaican academic who is a professor of social history at the University of the West Indies in Mona. She is the director of the university's Institute for Gender and Development Studies, and specialises in Jamaican social history and diaspora studies. She has published prolifically in journals and books on topics including Jamaican economic history during slavery, the Indian experience in Jamaica, migration and diasporas and Caribbean women's history, and is a contributor to the 2019 anthology New Daughters of Africa.

Early life and education
Shepherd was born in Hopewell, Saint Mary Parish, Jamaica, one of the 10 children of Ruthlyn and Alfred Lazarus. She attended Huffstead Basic School, Rosebank Primary School, and St. Mary High School, and then completed a teaching certificate at Shortwood Teachers' College. Shepherd went on to the University of the West Indies, where she completed a BA in history in 1976 and a M.Phil. in history in 1982. She was later awarded a PhD from the University of Cambridge in 1988 for her thesis on the economic history of colonial Jamaica.

Academic career
In 1988, Shepherd joined the Department of History at the University of the West Indies. She was elevated to a full professorship in 2001, and in 2010 was appointed director of the Institute for Gender and Development Studies. She has served as president of the Association of Caribbean Historians, chair of the Jamaica National Heritage Trust, chair of the Jamaica National Bicentenary Committee. Shepherd specialises in Jamaican social history and diaspora studies. She is an advocate of reparations for slavery, and in 2016 was appointed co-chair of Jamaica's National Council on Reparations. Shepherd has also held several positions within the Office of the United Nations High Commissioner for Human Rights, serving as a member of the Working Group of Experts on People of African Descent (WGEPAD) and the Committee on the Elimination of Racial Discrimination. She was chair of WGEPAD from 2011 to 2014, and lobbied for the creation of the International Decade for People of African Descent.

Zwarte Piet controversy
In 2013, in her role as chair of WGEPAD, Shepherd was asked to inquire into Zwarte Piet ("Black Pete"). She authored a letter, on "headed, official UN high commission for human rights paper" to the Dutch government proposing that it move towards ending the tradition, and in a later interview with EenVandaag described the character as "a throwback to slavery". Her remark complicated and further polarized an ongoing national debate, accompanied by protests and social media campaigns, in particular as she was supposedly speaking on behalf of the UN when this was not actually the case. Her remarks that Sinterklaas, a national feast in the Netherlands central to Dutch culture, could just be done away with in its entirety because "one Santa Claus is enough", (apparently referring to the American version who partially descends from Sinterklaas but is decidedly not the same), caused much anger and unleashed a public reaction that continues to have ramifications years later. A number of public figures, including Mark Rutte and Geert Wilders, spoke out in defence of Zwarte Piet. A Belgian UNESCO official later claimed that Shepherd had no authority to speak on behalf of the UN and was "abusing the name of the UN to bring her own agenda to the media".

Selected works
 Pens and pen-keepers in a plantation society: aspects of Jamaican social and economic history, 1740–1845 (thesis), University of Cambridge, 1988
 Transients to Settlers: The Experience of Indians in Jamaica 1845–1950: East Indians in Jamaica in the Late 19th and Early 20th Century, Peepal Tree Press, 1994,  
 Engendering History: Caribbean Women in Historical Perspective (edited with Bridget Brereton and Barbara Bailey), Palgrave MacMillan, 1995, 
 Women in Caribbean History: The British-Colonised Territories (compiled and edited), Ian Randle Publishers, 1999, 
 I Want to Disturb My Neighbour: Lectures on Slavery, Emancipation and Postcolonial Jamaica, Ian Randle Publishers, 2000  Maharani's Misery: Narratives of a Passage from India, University of West Indies Press, 2002, 
 Working Slavery-Pricing Freedom: Perspectives from the Caribbean, Africa and the African Diaspora (edited), James Currey, 2002, 
 Questioning Creole: Creolisation Discourses in Caribbean Culture (edited with Glen L. Richards), Ian Randle Publishers, 2004, 
 Caribbean Slavery in the Atlantic: A Student Reader, Ian Randle Publishers, 2004, 
 Liberties Lost: The Indigenous Caribbean and Slave Systems (with Hilary Beckles), Cambridge University Press, 2004, 
 Trading Souls: Europe's Transatlantic Trade in Africans (with Hilary Beckles), 2007
 Livestock, Sugar and Slavery: Contested Terrain in Colonial Jamaica, Ian Randle Publishers, 2009, 
 "Historicizing Gender-Based Violence in the Caribbean" in Margaret Busby (ed.), New Daughters of Africa'', 2019.

References

1951 births
People from Saint Mary Parish, Jamaica
Jamaican historians
Social historians
Women historians
University of the West Indies alumni
University of the West Indies academics
Alumni of the University of Cambridge
Historians of slavery
Members of the Committee on the Elimination of Racial Discrimination
Living people
Jamaican officials of the United Nations
Jamaican women writers
Jamaican writers
21st-century non-fiction writers